Hazard  was an Australian sloop wrecked in 1809.

Hazard was of unknown tonnage, probably built in Sydney in 1800.  It was owned by Thorley & Griffiths and had been chartered to Lusk.

In March 1809, three ships, Argument, Experiment, and Hazard left Pittwater, New South Wales, bound for Sydney with a cargo of wheat. Her master, Andrew Lusk, got into the ship's boat but was unable to persuade his single crew member, a boy, to join him. The boy was washed overboard and was dragged from the surf by some Aborigines. Lusk attempted to make it to shore but the boat capsized and Lusk drowned.

References

Shipwrecks of the Central Coast Region
Ships built in New South Wales
Sloops of Australia
Individual sailing vessels
1800s ships
Maritime incidents in 1809
1809 in Australia
1788–1850 ships of Australia
Coastal trading vessels of Australia